The 2022–23 Missouri State Bears basketball team represented Missouri State University during the 2022–23 NCAA Division I men's basketball season. The Bears, led by fifth-year head coach Dana Ford, played their home games at the Great Southern Bank Arena in Springfield, Missouri as members of the Missouri Valley Conference.

Previous Season
The Bears finished the 2021–22 season 23–11, 13–5 in MVC Play to finish in a three-way tie for 2nd place. They defeated Valparaiso in the quarterfinals of the MVC tournament before losing in the semifinals to Drake. They received an at-large bid to the National Invitation Tournament where they lost in the first round to Oklahoma.

Roster

Schedule and results

|-
!colspan=9 style=| Exhibition

|-
!colspan=9 style=| Regular season
|-

|-
!colspan=12 style=| MVC tournament

Source

References

Missouri State Bears basketball seasons
Missouri State
Missouri State
Missouri State